Zoro Garden is a 6-acre sunken garden within Balboa Park in San Diego, California. It is located between the Reuben H. Fleet Science Center and the Casa de Balboa. The name refers to the Persian mystic Zoroaster.

The stone garden was originally built for the 1915-16 Panama-California Exposition. During the 1935-36 California Pacific International Exposition it was the site of the Zoro Garden Nudist Colony, which featured mostly-nude performers rather than practicing nudists.

Zoro Garden is now planted as a butterfly garden. It is open to the public and can be reserved for special events.

References

External links

 San Diego Park and Recreation
 Balboa Park

Balboa Park (San Diego)
History of San Diego
Gardens in California